"Get It Poppin'" is a song by rapper Fat Joe featuring Nelly released on May 29, 2005. It was the second single released from the album All or Nothing. The song peaked at number nine on the US Billboard Hot 100 chart.

Background
The song interpolates vocals from the Just-Ice and KRS-One song "Moshitup", and was used as a secondary theme for WWE's SummerSlam 2005.

Chart performance
Get It Poppin' debuted at number 88 on the US Billboard Hot 100 chart, on the week of June 4, 2005. After two months on the chart, the song reached it peak at number nine on the chart dated July 30, 2005. This became Joe's second US top-ten song. On October 25, 2005, the single was certified gold by the Recording Industry Association of America (RIAA) for sales of over a 500,000 copies in the United States.

Music video
The video is set inside a nightclub and features Fat Joe and a shirtless Nelly dancing to the song in Atlanta, GA.  T.I., Ying Yang Twins, Boyz N Da Hood and Layzie Bone made cameo appearances.

Charts

Weekly charts

Year-end charts

Certifications

References 

2005 singles
Fat Joe songs
Music videos directed by Chris Robinson (director)
Nelly songs
Song recordings produced by Scott Storch
2005 songs
Songs written by Fat Joe
Songs written by Dre (record producer)
Songs written by Scott Storch